Communauté d'agglomération de Bar-le-Duc - Sud Meuse is the communauté d'agglomération, an intercommunal structure, centred on the town of Bar-le-Duc. It is located in the Meuse department, in the Grand Est region, northeastern France. Created in 2013, its seat is in Bar-le-Duc. Its area is 400.0 km2. Its population was 34,222 in 2019, of which 14,625 in Bar-le-Duc proper.

Composition
The communauté d'agglomération consists of the following 33 communes:

Bar-le-Duc
Behonne
Beurey-sur-Saulx
Chanteraine
Chardogne
Combles-en-Barrois
Culey
Fains-Véel
Givrauval
Guerpont
Ligny-en-Barrois
Loisey
Longeaux
Longeville-en-Barrois
Menaucourt
Naives-Rosières
Naix-aux-Forges
Nançois-sur-Ornain
Nant-le-Grand
Nantois
Resson
Robert-Espagne
Rumont
Saint-Amand-sur-Ornain
Salmagne
Savonnières-devant-Bar
Silmont
Tannois
Trémont-sur-Saulx
Tronville-en-Barrois
Val-d'Ornain
Vavincourt
Velaines

References

Bar-le-Duc
Bar-le-Duc